Sancti Spiritus (Latin genitive, 'of the holy spirit') or Sancti Spiritu may refer to:

Places
Sancti-Spíritus, Badajoz, Spain
Sancti-Spíritus, Salamanca, Spain
Sancti Spíritus, Cuba
Sancti Spíritus Province
Sancti Spíritus Airport
Sancti Spiritu (Argentina), a 1527 fortification

Other uses
Sancti Spiritus (cigar)
FC Sancti Spíritus, a Cuban football club, based in Sancti Spíritus
Sancti Spíritus (baseball), Cuba

See also

 Espírito Santo (disambiguation)
 Espiritu Santo (disambiguation)
 Holy Spirit (disambiguation)
 Santo Spirito (disambiguation)
 Spiritus Sanctus Academies
 Spiritus sancti gratia